Denis Lebel  (born May 26, 1954) is a Canadian politician and who served as mayor of Roberval, Quebec and deputy leader of the Official Opposition. Lebel was born in Roberval, Quebec.

Political career
Lebel was elected to the House of Commons of Canada on September 17, 2007, in the Roberval—Lac-Saint-Jean by-election, as a member of the Conservative Party. Four years later, it emerged that he had been an active member of the Bloc Quebecois from 1993 to 2001. Lebel stated that he joined the Conservatives because Prime Minister Stephen Harper recognized the Québécois nation, and maintains that he has always been a Quebec nationalist.

On October 30, 2008, he was appointed to Harper's cabinet as minister of the Economic Development Agency of Canada for the Regions of Quebec. Following the 2011 election, Lebel was promoted to minister of transport. He was shuffled out of the post in July 2013, shortly after the Lac-Megantic rail disaster.

He was also the minister of infrastructure, communities and intergovernmental affairs and served as the Harper government's Quebec lieutenant.

In the 2015 election, Lebel was re-elected in the new Lac-Saint-Jean riding.

After the election, he and fellow member of Parliament (MP) Michelle Rempel proposed to become joint interim leaders of the party but ultimately lost to Rona Ambrose.

On November 18, 2015 he was named deputy leader of the Conservative Party and thus deputy Opposition leader.

Career after politics
Lebel announced on June 19, 2017, that he will be stepping down as an MP in the following weeks, before the House of Commons resumed sitting in the fall. The seat was lost to the Liberals in the following by-election.

The Montreal Gazette reported on June 20, 2017, that Lebel was to be appointed as the CEO of Québec Forest Industry Council. It was also reported that then-premier of Quebec, Philippe Couillard was interested in recruiting Lebel to run for the Quebec Liberals in the 2018 Quebec general election, but he did not run.

Electoral history

References

External links
Denis Lebel official site

1954 births
Conservative Party of Canada MPs
French Quebecers
Living people
Mayors of places in Quebec
Members of the House of Commons of Canada from Quebec
Members of the King's Privy Council for Canada
People from Roberval, Quebec
Members of the 28th Canadian Ministry
Deputy opposition leaders